Worowice  is a village in the administrative district of Gmina Waśniów, within Ostrowiec County, Mazowieckie Voivodeship, in south-central Poland.

The village has a population of 130.

References

Villages in Płock County